The Symphony No. 7 in F major, Pastoral, Op. 77, was completed by Alexander Glazunov on July 4, 1902. It is dedicated to Mitrofan Belyayev.

It is in four movements:
Allegro moderato
Andante
Scherzo: Allegro giocoso
Finale: Allegro maestoso

References

External links

Symphonies by Alexander Glazunov
1902 compositions
Compositions in F major